The following lists events that happened during the 1710s in South Africa.

Events

1711
 28 December - Willem Helot is appointed acting Governor of the Cape Colony

1713
 16 March - A smallpox epidemic broke out at the Cape Colony

1714
 28 March - Maurits Pasques de Chavonnes is appointed Governor of the Cape

1717
 The system of freehold title to land in the Cape ends

Deaths

 27 December 1711 - Louis van Assenburgh, Governor of the Cape, dies
 24 June 1712 - Simon van der Stel, Governor of the Cape, died at his estate in Constantia, Cape Colony

References
See Years in South Africa for list of references.

History of South Africa